Saidman is a surname. Notable people with the surname include:

 Aaron Saidman (born 1974), American filmmaker and television producer
 Jean Saidman (1897–1949), Romanian-French solar therapist

See also
 Maidman
 Sandman (surname)